The Technik Museum Speyer is a technology museum in Speyer (Rhineland-Palatinate), Germany.

History 
The museum was opened in 1991 as a sister museum of the Auto & Technik Museum Sinsheim and is run by a registered alliance called "Auto & Technik Museum Sinsheim e.V.". , it has more than 2,000 exhibits and an exhibition area of more than 150,000 m² (indoors and outdoors). It attracts more than half a million visitors per year. In addition to the exhibitions, the museum also sports a 22 m x 27 m giant IMAX Dome theatre.

Exhibits 
Central pieces of the exhibition include several preserved aircraft. In spring 2002, Lufthansa donated a retired Boeing 747-200 aircraft, which is now accessible to visitors. In April 2008, a Soviet/Russian Buran spacecraft, OK-GLI, was transported to the Technik Museum and is now another walk-in exhibit. Other walk-in highlights are an Antonov An-22 and several other aircraft types, locomotives, the houseboat Sean O'Kelley of The Kelly Family, and submarine U9 of the German Navy.

Other exhibits display fire engines, mechanical organs, vintage cars, motorcycles and locomotives, helicopters and military aircraft. Additionally theres a Maritime and miniature model museum section as well as the Wilhelmsbau, a separate building which shows rare objects including historic fashion, weapons, jewels, dolls, toys, uniforms, and automatic musical instruments.

References

Citations

Bibliography

 Musikautomaten im Auto & Technik Museum Sinsheim bzw. Musikautomaten, Moden und Uniformen im Technik Museum Speyer: 192 p, two Languages: German and English; 
Heinz Elser, Margrit Elser-Haft, Vladim Lukashevich: Buran - History and Transportation of the Russian Space shuttle OK-GLI to the Technik Museum Speyer, two Languages: German and Englisch, 2008,

External links 

 Astrotalkuk.org Interview from Technik Museum Speyer 23 December 2013
 Technik Museum Speyer 
 Technik Museum Speyer 

1991 establishments in Germany
Culture of the Palatinate (region)
Museums established in 1991
Museums in Rhineland-Palatinate
Speyer
Technology museums in Germany